Canas Province is one of thirteen provinces in the Cusco Region in the southern highlands of Peru.

Geography 
The La Raya mountain range traverses the province. Some of the highest mountains of the province are listed below:

Political division 
The province is divided into eight districts (singular: distrito), each of which is headed by a mayor (alcalde). The districts, with their capitals in parenthesis, are:

 Checca (Checca)
 Kunturkanki (El Descanso)
 Langui (Langui)
 Layo (Layo)
 Pampamarca (Pampamarca)
 Quehue (Quehue)
 Túpac Amaru (Tungasuca)
 Yanaoca (Yanaoca)

Ethnic groups 
The people in the province are mainly indigenous citizens of Quechua descent. Quechua is the language which the majority of the population (91.62%) learnt to speak in childhood, 8.13% of the residents started speaking in Spanish.

See also 
 Tupay Tuqtu

References 

Provinces of the Cusco Region